The Damned is a horror-noir American comic book created by Cullen Bunn and Brian Hurtt, and published by Oni Press.

Plot synopsis
The Damned is set in prohibition era in a city where demonic crime families vie for human souls. The narrator, Eddie Tamblyn, is a man cursed to return from the dead—whoever touches Eddie while he's dead, assumes his fatal wounds and Eddie's resurrected. Because of his unique abilities, Eddie often finds himself being used by the crime families for their own ends.

Three Days Dead
The Aligheri and Roarke crime families are coming to a "mutually beneficial" agreement set to put an end to their territorial squabbles, but the demon sent to broker the truce has gone missing. Eddie agrees to find the missing broker for Alphonse Aligheri in exchange for wiping his debts.

Ill-Gotten
Pauly Bones, an old double dealer from Eddie's past, seeks refuge at the Gehenna Room now that Eddie's got a "no demons allowed" policy. The demons want something from Pauly, something that might just be enough to trade for a few souls.

Publication history
The first miniseries, Three Days Dead, ran from October 2006 to February 2007. There was also a six-page issue #0 published in October 2006. A second miniseries followed in 2008, the three-issue Prodigal Sons.

In 2017, The Damned was relaunched as an ongoing series. The original five-issue miniseries was adapted to color and published as a new trade paperback in March. The Damned #1 followed in May with a new arc designed to continue the story for returning readers while introducing the world and characters to new readers.

The color version of the Prodigal Sons arc appeared in The Damned #6–8 with minor alterations to better fit in with the mythology of the ongoing series. The planned three-issue Daughter's Danse arc only released the first issue and The Damned has been in hiatus since then.

Issues

Collected editions
The first miniseries has been collected into a trade paperback twice, once in black and white in 2007, then later in color in 2017.

Both miniseries have been released in French by Akileos:
Tome 1 : Mort depuis trois jours (146 pages, April 2008)
Tome 2 : Les fils prodigues (100 pages, March, 2009)

Adaptations

Film
DreamWorks optioned The Damned for a film in 2008, to be written by David DiGilio.

TV series
It was announced in August 2011 that Showtime had bought the rights to adapt the comic book into a television series, with David Hayter being brought in to write it.

Notes

References

External links

The Damned on Cullen Bunn's site

Comics by Cullen Bunn
Neo-noir comics